Symphytum bulbosum, common name bulbous comfrey, is a flowering plant of the genus Symphytum in the family Boraginaceae.

Description
Symphytum bulbosum can reach a height between 15 and 50 centimeters. The petals are pale yellow, about 1 inch long. This plant is flowering in March and April.

Distribution

References

 Biolib
 EuroMed Plant base
 Luirig.altervista.org

bulbosum